Moczydło may refer to the following places:
Moczydło, Lesser Poland Voivodeship (south Poland)
Moczydło, Masovian Voivodeship (east-central Poland)
Moczydło, Świętokrzyskie Voivodeship (south-central Poland)
Moczydło, Silesian Voivodeship (south Poland)
Moczydło, Pomeranian Voivodeship (north Poland)
Moczydło, Kartuzy County in Pomeranian Voivodeship (north Poland)
Moczydło, West Pomeranian Voivodeship (north-west Poland)